PBM may refer to:

Organizations
 Parti Bangsa Malaysia, a registered political party in Malaysia
 Partido Bagong Maharlika, a political party in the Philippines active in the 2016 elections; see 2016 Philippine presidential election

Transport
 Johan Adolf Pengel International Airport, Paramaribo, Suriname, IATA code
 PBM Mariner, a flying boat
 Paul Bird Motorsport, UK

Other
 Portable bitmap format, an image file format
 Pharmacy benefit management
 Post-nominal letters for Singapore Pingat Bakti Masyarakat (Public Service Medal)
 Play-by-mail game
 Pretty Bitch Music, forthcoming studio album by Saweetie
 Progressive British Muslims, former religious organisation in the United Kingdom
 Poultry by-product meal